GPS Block IIF, or GPS IIF is an interim class of GPS (satellite), which are used to keep the Navstar Global Positioning System operational until the GPS Block IIIA satellites become operational. They were built by Boeing, to be operated by the United States Air Force being launched by United Launch Alliance (ULA), using Evolved Expendable Launch Vehicles (EELV). They are the final component of the Block II GPS constellation to be launched. On 5 February 2016, the final satellite in the GPS Block IIF was successfully launched, completing the block.

The satellites replace the GPS Block IIA satellites that were launched between 1990 and 1997 and were designed to last 7.5 years. The final satellite of the Block IIA series was decommissioned on 25 January 2016. The operational constellation now includes Block IIR, IIRM, IIF and III variants.

Because the Evolved Expendable Launch Vehicles are more powerful than the Delta II, which was used to orbit earlier Block II GPS satellites, they can place the satellites directly into their operational orbits. As a result, Block IIF satellites do not carry apogee kick motors. The original contract for Block IIF, signed in 1996, called for 33 spacecraft. This was later reduced to 12, and program delays and technical problems pushed the first launch from 2006 to 2010.

New characteristics 
 Broadcasting L5 "safety of life" navigation signal demonstrated on USA-203
 Broadcasting a new M-code signal 
 Doubling in the predicted accuracy 
 Better resistance to jamming
 Reprogrammable processors that can receive software uploads 
 The first GPS satellites not to have Selective Availability (SA) hardware installed, which degraded civilian accuracy when turned on in the original satellite fleet

Launch history 
Overall, 12 GPS Block IIF satellites were launched, all of which are currently operational:

See also 

 BeiDou Navigation Satellite System
 BeiDou-2 (COMPASS) navigation system
 Galileo (satellite navigation)
 GLONASS
 Quasi-Zenith Satellite System

References 

Global Positioning System